Philip 'Phil' Scanlan is a British former sports shooter who won three Commonwealth Games medals. He was Team GB Shooting Team Leader at the 2012 Summer Olympics.

Sports shooting career
Scanlan represented England and won two bronze medals in the small bore rifle prone and small bore rifle prone pairs with Bob Jarvis, at the 1990 Commonwealth Games in Auckland, New Zealand. Eight years later he won a third medal when securing a silver medal in the 50 metres free rifle prone pairs with Neil Day.

References

External Links

1957 births
Living people
British male sport shooters
Shooters at the 1990 Commonwealth Games
Shooters at the 1998 Commonwealth Games
Commonwealth Games medallists in shooting
Commonwealth Games silver medallists for England
Commonwealth Games bronze medallists for England
Medallists at the 1990 Commonwealth Games
Medallists at the 1998 Commonwealth Games